Calvert High School is a private, Catholic high school in Tiffin, Ohio.  It is part of the Roman Catholic Diocese of Toledo. Athletic teams are known as the Senecas.

Calvert Catholic Schools structure
Since the 2010–2011 school year, grades preschool through sixth have met at the Calvert Elementary Campus, while the Calvery High School campus houses students in grades seven through twelve.

State championships

 Girls Volleyball – 2018 and 2020 
 Boys Football – 1980 and 1981 
 Boys Golf – 1976

External links

Notes and references

Catholic secondary schools in Ohio
High schools in Seneca County, Ohio
Educational institutions established in 1923
1923 establishments in Ohio